My Zoe is a 2019 drama film written and directed by Julie Delpy. It stars Delpy, Richard Armitage, Daniel Brühl, Gemma Arterton, Saleh Bakri, Lindsay Duncan and Sophia Ally.

The film had its world premiere at the Toronto International Film Festival on 7 September 2019. It was released in Germany on 14 November 2019, by Warner Bros. Pictures and in the United Kingdom on 5 October 2020, by Signature Entertainment.

Premise
Isabelle (Julie Delpy), a geneticist recovering from a toxic marriage, is raising her only daughter, Zoe, with her contentious ex-husband (Richard Armitage). Zoe means everything to her mother and so when tragedy strikes the fractured family, Isabelle uses her expertise to take matters into her own hands. As this mother’s love knows no bounds, Isabelle travels to Russia in seeking the help of a world-renowned fertility physician (Daniel Brühl) who Isabelle believes can help bring back her little girl.

Cast
Julie Delpy as Isabelle Perrault-Lewis
Gemma Arterton as Laura Fischer
Daniel Brühl as Thomas Fischer
Richard Armitage as James Lewis
Sophia Ally as Zoe Perrault-Lewis
Saleh Bakri as Akil Beser
Lindsay Duncan as Kathy
Lucas Prisor as Young Doctor
Patrick Güldenberg as Professor Hoffman
Jördis Triebel as Dr. Hazs

Production
Julie Delpy had begun conceptualising the film 20 years prior to the December 2016 announcement she was set to write, direct and star in the film, alongside Gemma Arterton, Daniel Brühl and Lior Ashkenazi. Richard Armitage and Sophia Ally were added in February 2017. Shooting was due to begin in the spring of that year, however development on the film stalled, and in December that year Delpy announced it was due to the film's major financier pulling out of the film in November, which she referred to as being for sexist reasons.

New financing was found by the time filming began in May 2018, with Saleh Bakri and Lindsay Duncan added to the cast.

Release
The film had its world premiere at the Toronto International Film Festival in the Platform Prize program on 7 September 2019. It was released in Germany on 14 November 2019, by Warner Bros. Pictures, and in the United Kingdom on 5 October 2020, by Signature Entertainment.

The film was set to screen at the Tribeca Film Festival in April 2020, however, the festival was cancelled due to the COVID-19 pandemic. It was released in the United States on 26 February 2021, by Blue Fox Entertainment.

Reception
The site's critical consensus reads, "Storytelling isn't My Zoes strength, but the depth of feeling that writer-director-star Julie Delpy brings to her characters helps offset this drama's flaws." On Metacritic, the film has a weighted average score of 59 out of 100, based on 10 critics, indicating "mixed or average reviews".

IndieWire raved that “Delpy’s ability to believe in both her audience and her wild story remains compelling throughout the film... Delpy earns every minute of the story, one that shows off her ability (and desire) mix things up with a fresh eye.”

References

External links
 
 
 

2019 films
Films shot in Berlin
Films shot in Moscow
Films directed by Julie Delpy
French drama films
German drama films
Films with screenplays by Julie Delpy
Warner Bros. films
2010s French films
2010s German films